The Mount Lefo brush-furred mouse (Lophuromys eisentrauti), also known as Eisentraut's brush-furred rat or , is a species of rodent in the family Muridae. It is only found in Mount Lefo, the western area of Cameroon.

References

Lophuromys
Rodents of Africa
Mammals of Cameroon
Endemic fauna of Cameroon
Mammals described in 1978
Fauna of the Cameroonian Highlands forests